Brian "Penny" Collins  is an American college basketball coach, and current head coach of the Tennessee State Tigers basketball team.

Playing career
A Nashville native, Collins was a four-year starter at hometown Belmont under Rick Byrd, and was the captain of the Bruins first-ever NCAA Tournament appearance at the Division I level in 2006. He scored 1,199 points in his career, and left the school as the all-time leader in assists and steals at the Division I level.

After graduation, Collins played professional basketball between 2006 and 2007 with the Bakersfield Jam of the NBDL and Kouvot in Finland.

Coaching career
In 2007, Collins began his coaching career serving as a graduate assistant and director of basketball operations at Tennessee State until 2009, when he accepted an assistant coaching position at NAIA institution Cumberland.

Collins landed his first head coaching job, taking the reins of Columbia State where he took over a team that went 10–17 in his first year, but compiled a 54–11 overall record in his final two seasons and led the team to two-straight NCJAA national tournament appearances. After the 2015 season, Collins joined the staff at ETSU for two seasons before spending one season at Illinois St. as an assistant coach.

On March 26, 2018, Collins was named the 21st head coach in Tennessee State history, replacing Dana Ford, who accepted the head coaching position at Missouri State.

Head coaching record

NJCAA

NCAA DI

References

Living people
1984 births
American men's basketball coaches
American expatriate basketball people in Finland
Bakersfield Jam players
Basketball coaches from Tennessee
Basketball players from Tennessee
Belmont Bruins men's basketball players
College men's basketball head coaches in the United States
East Tennessee State Buccaneers men's basketball coaches
Illinois State Redbirds men's basketball coaches
Junior college men's basketball coaches in the United States
Tennessee State Tigers basketball coaches
American men's basketball players